is a 1967 Japanese superhero kaiju film directed by Hajime Tsuburaya, with special effects by Koichi Takano. Produced by Tsuburaya Productions and distributed by Toho Co., Ltd., it is the first film in the Ultraman franchise, consisting entirely of re-edited material from the original series. In the film, an extraterrestrial defends Earth from giant monsters who pose a threat to humanity.

Ultraman: Monster Movie Feature was released theatrically in Japan on July 22, 1967, where it was distributed by Toho as double feature with their film King Kong Escapes, which was less popular among Japanese children upon its release. During its theatrical run, it grossed  in just three theaters in Tokyo.

Cast

Production
Ultraman: Monster Movie Feature was edited from episodes 1, 8, 26, and 27 of the television series Ultraman originally broadcast on the Japanese television station TBS from 1966 to 1967. The episodes were blown up to 35mm from their 16mm original television prints.

Release

Marketing 
Since the majority of television-owning Japanese households had black-and-white televisions at the time of Ultraman's broadcast on TBS, the film was marketed as a color production to encourage children to watch it.

Theatrical
Ultraman: Monster Movie Feature was released theatrically in Japan on July 22, 1967, where it was distributed by Toho as double feature with King Kong Escapes, which was less popular among Japanese children upon its release. During its theatrical run, it grossed  in just three theaters in Tokyo. The film has never been released in the United States.

Home media
In 2006, Avex Trax released the film on DVD. The film was included along with 5 other theatrical Ultraman films on a 9-disc box set released by Tsuburaya Productions on April 7, 2011, in celebration of their 45th anniversary.

Critical response
On review aggregator Filmarks, the film has an average rating of 3.2/5 based on 229 reviews.

Notes

References
Footnotes

Bibliography

 
 
 

 
 
 
 
 

Online references

External links
 
 
 
 

1967 films
Films set in Osaka
Ultra Series films
Japanese superhero films
Toho tokusatsu films
1960s superhero films
Films edited from television programs
Giant monster films
Kaiju films
1960s Japanese films